The Peter Walker House is a historic colonial house located at 1679 Somerset Avenue in Taunton, Massachusetts.

Description and history 
Built in about 1727, this -story, Georgian style, wood-framed house is the oldest documented house in the city. It is five bays wide and two bays deep, with a side-gable roof and a large central chimney. Its main entry is framed by pilasters, and topped by a fanlight and gabled pediment. Peter Walker purchased the land, and is said to have built the house soon afterward as a wedding present for his new bride.

The house was listed on the National Register of Historic Places on July 5, 1984.

See also
National Register of Historic Places listings in Taunton, Massachusetts

References

Houses completed in 1727
Houses in Taunton, Massachusetts
National Register of Historic Places in Taunton, Massachusetts
Houses on the National Register of Historic Places in Bristol County, Massachusetts